Housesitter is a 1992 American romantic comedy film directed by Frank Oz, written by Mark Stein, and starring Steve Martin and Goldie Hawn. The premise involves a woman with con-artist tendencies who worms her way into the life of a reserved architect by claiming to be his wife.

Plot
Newton Davis (Steve Martin) is a struggling architect. After building his dream house for himself and his longtime girlfriend Becky (Dana Delany) in his hometown, he is crushed when she refuses to marry him. He is unable to bring himself to live in the house, and leaves it abandoned and with a debt he cannot afford. Three months later, Newton meets a waitress named Gwen (Goldie Hawn) at a Hungarian restaurant in Boston. Believing that she cannot speak English, he spills out his sob story about Becky and the abandoned house. After the restaurant closes for the night, Newton learns she merely pretended to be Hungarian, and can speak English. He walks her home, which turns out to be a small apartment upstairs at the restaurant. They end up having sex.

The next morning, Gwen finds that Newton left in the middle of the night. However, he unintentionally left behind the drawing of the house he'd built for Becky. Interest piqued by the drawing, Gwen takes a bus ride out to see the house. She is charmed by it, and decides to move in. Gwen goes to the town's general store, where she charges her groceries to the "Newton Davis" account. When questioned about this, Gwen, who it becomes clear is a natural liar, says that she is Newton's wife. Gwen meets Becky, and spins a lengthy romantic story about how they fell in love, which surprises and impresses Becky. Gwen also meets Newton's parents, who are heartbroken that Newton got "married" without telling them, but Gwen manages to smooth things over with them with her charm.

Soon after, Newton travels to his hometown and is shocked to see that his house is lived in. When he finds out what Gwen has done he is initially furious, but he soon sees the potential in her being there. Gwen starts creating all sorts of opportunities for Newton: mending his relationship with his parents, helping out with his career by befriending Newton's boss and highlighting his long-ignored talent, and making Becky jealous. Newton and Gwen come to an agreement in which Gwen will help Newton win Becky, and in return she'll get all the furniture in the house. Through their time together, Newton begins to rely more on Gwen beyond their agreement, and Gwen starts to feel attached to her life with Newton. It is also revealed that Gwen became a compulsive liar in order to escape from what she feels is her own inadequate background, and that she has "changed" her life numerous times.

The film culminates with a reception held at the house in which the sub-plots of Newton's career, family and affections for Becky are brought together. Annoyed with Becky for her superior and suspicious attitude, Gwen confronts her in front of everyone, accusing her of trying to win Newton back. Gwen storms out of the house in tears, and Newton follows her, thinking it is still part of the plan. Outside alone, Newton praises Gwen for her brilliance, but Gwen replies that she wanted their marriage to work. Her feelings for him are apparent. Newton's boss gives him the promotion. Newton watches, confused, as Gwen leaves. Becky takes the opportunity to make a move on Newton, and asks whether all of Gwen's elaborate stories were real. Newton answers that they were all true and chases after Gwen.

Newton stops Gwen as she is about to board a bus to leave town. Although she resists, Newton follows her example and begins telling an outlandish romantic story of something they "did", which makes Gwen decide to stay. The film ends on the note of Newton and Gwen being happily married and living together in the house. As Newton and Gwen go into the house together, the final spoken words are of Newton saying "I love you, Gwen" and Gwen replying, "Actually, it's Jessica."

Cast
 Steve Martin as Newton Davis
 Goldie Hawn as Gwen Duncle/Buckley/Phillips
 Dana Delany as Becky Metcalf
 Julie Harris as Edna Davis
 Donald Moffat as George Davis
 Peter MacNicol as Marty
 Richard B. Shull as Ralph / Bernie Duncle
 Ken Cheeseman as Harv
 Laurel Cronin as Mary / Mary Duncle
 Roy Cooper as Winston Moseby
 Christopher Durang as Reverend Lipton

Production
According to Rotten Tomatoes, the house featured in the film was designed by New York architects Trumbull & Associates. Christopher Lukenbeal's 1995 master's thesis A Geography in Film, A Geography of Film cites Debra Wassman of Trumbull: "the house is the real star of the film". The 1800-square-foot, three-bedroom home won the House Beautiful/American Wood Council Award for Best Small House of 1990 and blueprints were available for purchase from Princeton Architectural Press.

The role of Gwen Phillips was initially offered to Meg Ryan, who pulled out due to creative differences.

Principal photography ran from August to October 1991, and took place in Massachusetts, with filming locations including Boston, Concord, and Cohasset.

Release and reception
Housesitter received mixed reviews from critics, as it holds a 36% rating on Rotten Tomatoes based on 22 reviews. Noted film critic Roger Ebert, gave it three stars saying, "this is one of [Goldie Hawn's] best performances" and praised her and Steve Martin's impeccable comic timing.

Vincent Canby of The New York Times opined that the film is "a cardboard vehicle in which Steve Martin and Goldie Hawn ride up front, doing what each does with great talent and occasional vigor, and a lot of very able character actors sit in the back, kibitzing and adding local color." Gene Siskel wrote that the film was "a one-note comedy with screwball aspirations [that] is amusing while it sets up its premise [and then] attempts to recycle the premise into a story." Kenneth Turan of the Los Angeles Times called the film "an occasionally amusing screwball farce made by people whose screws are barely loose at all."

The film was released theatrically on June 12, 1992, after being moved back from an initial May 8 release date, and performed reasonably well for a low-key comedy film. It earned $9.1 million on its opening weekend and $58.5 million for its entire domestic theatrical run, grossing a total of $94.9 million worldwide.

The film was released on DVD on July 22, 1998 and eventually on Blu-ray on April 16, 2019.

References

External links

 
 
 
 

1992 films
1992 romantic comedy films
1990s screwball comedy films
American romantic comedy films
American screwball comedy films
1990s English-language films
Films about architecture
Films directed by Frank Oz
Films produced by Brian Grazer
Films set in Boston
Films set in Massachusetts
Films shot in Boston
Films shot in Massachusetts
Films scored by Miles Goodman
Imagine Entertainment films
Universal Pictures films
1990s American films